Stefan Bissegger (born 13 September 1998) is a Swiss professional road and track racing cyclist, who currently rides for UCI WorldTeam . He rode in the men's individual pursuit event at the 2018 UCI Track Cycling World Championships.

Major results

Road

2016
 1st  Overall Driedaagse van Axel
1st Stages 2 & 4
2018
 1st   Time trial, National Under-23 Championships
2019
 1st  Time trial, National Under-23 Championships
 New Zealand Cycle Classic
1st  Points classification
1st Stage 2
 Tour de l'Avenir
1st Stages 2 (TTT) & 6
 1st Stage 1 Tour de l'Ain
 1st Stage 2 Tour du Jura
 2nd  Road race, UCI World Under-23 Championships
 2nd Overall Grand Prix Priessnitz spa
1st  Points classification
1st Stage 1
 UEC European Under-23 Championships
3rd  Time trial
7th Road race
 4th Eschborn–Frankfurt Under-23
2020
 UEC European Championships
2nd  Under-23 Time trial
2nd  Team relay
 3rd Time trial, National Championships
 5th Giro della Toscana
 7th Overall Orlen Nations Grand Prix
2021
 Tour de Suisse
1st  Points classification
1st Stage 4
 1st Stage 3 (ITT) Paris–Nice
 1st Stage 2 (ITT) Benelux Tour
 4th Time trial, UEC European Championships
 7th Time trial, UCI World Championships
2022
 UCI World Championships
1st  Team relay
5th Time trial
 1st  Time trial, UEC European Championships
 1st Stage 3 (ITT) UAE Tour
 7th Chrono des Nations

Grand Tour general classification results timeline

Track

2016
 1st  Individual pursuit, UCI World Junior Championships
2017
 National Championships
1st  Elimination
1st  Keirin
1st  Points
2018
 National Championships
1st  Elimination
1st  Kilo

References

External links
 

1998 births
Living people
Swiss male cyclists
People from Weinfelden
Swiss track cyclists
Olympic cyclists of Switzerland
Cyclists at the 2020 Summer Olympics
Sportspeople from Thurgau
Tour de Suisse stage winners
20th-century Swiss people
21st-century Swiss people
UCI Road World Champions (elite men)